Playlist: the Very Best of Ciara  is the first compilation album by American recording artist, Ciara, released on May 29, 2012 through Legacy Recordings as part of the Playlist music series. The album includes singles, remixes, and album cuts from Ciara's time with LaFace Records, in which she released her first four studio albums.

Critical reception

Allmusic reviewer, Andy Kellman, praised Ciara's artistry but criticized the label's choice of songs. Kellman stated, "Each release in the Playlist series tends to be pitched somewhere between a proper overview and a rarities collection. The approach can be aggravating to both casual and loyal fans of a given artist. Sure enough, this is the case with Ciara's Playlist, which covers 2004's Goodies through 2010's Basic Instinct. During this period, Ciara delivered nine singles to the Top Ten of Billboard's R&B/Hip-Hop chart. Only five of them are here; "Oh," "Get Up," and "Ride" are missing, while "Like a Boy" appears in the form of a Jonathan Peters dancefloor remix. This leaves plenty of room for other material, from "Speechless" (an excellent single that flopped) to "The Title" (a solid, L.T.D.-sampling album cut) to the "slow bass remix" of "Gimme Dat" (which easily trumps the original mix). The singer's catalog deserves better than this."

Track listing

Release history

References

2012 greatest hits albums
Ciara albums
Ciara